The Migration Review Tribunal was an Australian administrative law tribunal established in 1989. 

Along with the Refugee Review Tribunal, the Migration Review Tribunal was amalgamated to a division of the Administrative Appeals Tribunal on 1 July 2015.

References

External links
Migration Review Tribunal decisions at the Austlii website
Australia Immigration & Visas Knowledge Center Website

1989 establishments in Australia
2015 disestablishments in Australia
Former Commonwealth of Australia courts and tribunals
Migration-related organisations based in Australia
Courts and tribunals established in 1989
Courts and tribunals disestablished in 2015